Qarah Cham (also Romanized as Qareh Cham) is a village in Khandan Rural District, Tarom Sofla District, Qazvin County, Qazvin Province, Iran. At the 2006 census, its population was 126, in 30 families.

References 

Populated places in Qazvin County